The 1970 Arizona Wildcats football team represented the University of Arizona in the Western Athletic Conference (WAC) during the 1970 NCAA University Division football season.  In their second season under head coach Bob Weber, the Wildcats compiled a 4–6 record (2–4 against WAC opponents), finished in fifth place in the WAC, and were outscored by their opponents, 213 to 168.  The team played its home games on campus at Arizona Stadium in Tucson, Arizona.

The team's statistical leaders included Brian Linstrom with 884 passing yards, Willie Lewis with 665 rushing yards, and Hal Arnason with 569 receiving yards.

This was the final season in which Arizona played only ten regular season games, as the NCAA added an eleventh game for all teams beginning in 1971.

Schedule

Game summaries

UTEP

Arizona went to El Paso and fell behind early and did not recover as UTEP went on to win. To date, this remains the last time that the Wildcats lost to the Miners. Also, the loss led to Arizona failing to win a road game for the second season in a row.

Arizona State

In a low-scoring affair, the Wildcats held ninth-ranked Arizona State in check, but ultimately fell short to end the season. ASU would go on to finish with a perfect record.

Roster

References

Arizona
Arizona Wildcats football seasons
Arizona Wildcats football